Flogging a dead horse (or "beating a dead horse" or "beating a dead dog") is a common English idiom.

Flogging a dead horse or beating a dead horse may also refer to:

 Flogging a Dead Horse, 1980 compilation album of singles by the Sex Pistols

Titled works beginning "Beating ..." 
 Beating Dead Horses,  studio album by the industrial metal band 16Volt
 Beating a Dead Horse to Death... Again, 2008 album by Dog Fashion Disco
 Beating a Dead Horse (album), a 2015 album by YouTuber Jarrod Alonge

See also
 Dead horse (disambiguation)